Stanislav Namașco (born 10 November 1986) is a Moldovan professional footballer who plays as a goalkeeper for Moldovan Super Liga club CSF Bălți, and the Moldova national team.

Career
In the 2007–08 season, he won the Moldovan Championship and the Moldovan Cup. In March 2011, he is credited with an incredible performance in an international match for Moldova away against Sweden after stopping, among many things, a penalty shot from Zlatan Ibrahimović.

In July 2014, Namașco signed a two-year contract with AZAL PFK of the Azerbaijan Premier League.

In July 2016, Namașco signed a two-year contract with Greek club Levadiakos.

Namasco returned to Moldova on 28 July 2022, signing a contract with Moldovan Super Liga club CSF Bălți.

Career statistics

References

External links

UEFA profile

1986 births
Living people
FC Tiraspol players
FC Sheriff Tiraspol players
Moldovan footballers
Association football goalkeepers
Moldovan expatriate footballers
Expatriate footballers in Russia
FC Kuban Krasnodar players
PFC Spartak Nalchik players
FC Volgar Astrakhan players
Russian Premier League players
Moldova international footballers
Expatriate footballers in Slovenia
NK Domžale players
AZAL PFK players
Levadiakos F.C. players
FK Dečić players
FK Zeta players
Shamakhi FK players
CSF Bălți players
Moldovan Super Liga players
Super League Greece players
Montenegrin First League players
Expatriate footballers in Greece
Azerbaijan Premier League players
Expatriate footballers in Azerbaijan
Moldovan expatriate sportspeople in Azerbaijan
Moldovan expatriate sportspeople in Greece
Expatriate footballers in Montenegro